Decorra is an unincorporated community in Henderson County, in the U.S. state of Illinois.

History
Decorra was founded in the 1880s when the railroad was extended to that point. A post office was established at Decorra in 1888, and remained in operation until 1929.

References

Unincorporated communities in Henderson County, Illinois
Unincorporated communities in Illinois
1880s establishments in Illinois